Jayeshbhai Jordaar is a 2022 Indian Hindi-language comedy-drama film written and directed by Divyang Thakkar. Produced by Maneesh Sharma and Aditya Chopra under the Yash Raj Films, the film stars Ranveer Singh as the eponymous lead. He plays the son of a traditional Gujarati sarpanch, who believes in equal rights between males and females in society. Shalini Pandey, Boman Irani and Ratna Pathak Shah also play pivotal roles.

Principal photography commenced in Mumbai on 4 December 2019, which later shifted to Gujarat. The film wrapped up on 7 February 2020. The film met to multiple release date postponements during 2020–2021, as it wasn't unveiled due to the COVID-19 pandemic, with makers in wait rather than releasing it on OTT platforms. Finally, the film released theatrically on 13 May 2022. It did not perform well and was a huge commercial failure, causing great losses for makers.

Plot 
Jayesh Patel (lovingly called Jayeshbhai Jordaar by his daughter) is an educated man who lives with his father Pruthvish (the village sarpanch), his mother Jashoda, his pregnant wife Mudra and his modern daughter Siddhi in the fictional village of Pravingarh. The family hopes that the child is a boy, so that he could continue his lineage and become the next Gujarati Sarpanch after Jayesh. In a regular check up with the doctor, Jayesh learns that his second child is also a girl.

In a flashback, it is revealed that Siddhi's birth was forgiven because she was the firstborn, but after that, Mudra was forced to abort 6 female children in her womb in the past 9 years, for not being able to conceive a male heir. However, Jayesh, who strongly believes in having equal rights for both men and women decides not to inform his family as he wants the baby to be born.

He makes a plan to elope with Mudra and Siddhi to Laadopur, a fictional village in Haryana, whose entire population are males only. One day, Jashoda arranges a meeting with a doctor who could predict the gender for their child. Jayesh executes his plan in front of his parents, who believe that Mudra has kidnapped Jayesh (actually an act). 

The story then follows about how Jayesh fights for the rights for his wife as well as all other ladies of his village.

Cast 

 Ranveer Singh as Jayesh Patel aka Jayeshbhai Jordaar
 Shalini Pandey as Mudra Patel, Jayesh's wife
 Boman Irani as Pruthvish Patel, Jayesh's father
 Ratna Pathak Shah as Jashoda Patel, Jayesh's mother
 Jia Vaidya as Siddhi Patel, Jayesh and Mudra's daughter
 Deeksha Joshi as Preeti, Jayesh's sister
Puneet Issar as Amar Tau
 Ragi Jani as Sanjay Patel, Jayesh's Uncle

Production 
The film was announced on 27 May 2019, to be directed by Divyang Thakkar, produced by Yash Raj Films, and starring Ranveer Singh as the titular Gujarati man. Singh's first look was released on 4 December 2019 to announce that filming had started in Mumbai. Boman Irani and Ratna Pathak were cast as Singh's parents while South actress Shalini Pandey was paired opposite him. The Gujarat filming portion commenced in January 2020 and filming wrapped up on 7 February 2020.

Release
It was initially scheduled to hit theatrical screens on 2 October 2020 coinciding with Gandhi Jayanti, and then on 27 August 2021 and 25 February 2022, but the COVID-19 pandemic led its postponement. The film was released theatrically on 13 May 2022.

Reception

Box office 
Jayeshbhai Jordaar earned 3.25 crore at the domestic box office on its opening day. On the second day, the film collected 4 crore. On the third day, the film collected 4.75 crore, taking total domestic weekend collection to 12 crore.

, the film grossed  crore in India and  crore overseas, for a worldwide gross collection of  crore.

Critical Response
 Jayeshbhai Jordaar received mixed reviews from critics. Nairita Mukherjee of India Today rated the film 3.5 out of 5 stars and wrote "Ranveer is a class apart. The more we see him over the years, the more we realise how exponentially he's grown". Umesh Punwani of Koimoi rated the film 3.5 out of 5 stars and wrote "Jayeshbai Jordaar doesn't address an 'outdated subject', it picks up an issue tackled before adding its own charm, humour, 'pappi-worthy' emotions & 'oh so amazing' performances by Ranveer, Jia". Bollywood Hungama rated the film 3 out of 5 stars and wrote "Despite featuring some 'jordaar' moments and performances , Jayeshbhai Jordaar suffers from inconsistent writing". Sukanya Verma of Rediff rated the film 3 out of 5 stars and wrote "Essentially a message movie, Jayeshbhai Jordaar masks its horror in humour to play out like an on-the-run road trip". Devesh Sharma of Filmfare rated the film 3 out of 5 stars and wrote "Watch Jayeshbhai Jordaar for the film"s mesaage and to see Ranveer Singh excelling in a never-seen-before avatar".

Renuka Vyavahare of The Times of India rated the film 2.5 out of 5 stars and wrote "Ranveer Singh is a firecracker when it comes to performances and screen presence but the script douses his fire. Saibal Chatterjee of NDTV rated the film 2.5 out of 5 stars and wrote "Played with consistent aplomb by an irrepressible Ranveer Singh isn't a stud strutting around the village calling constant attention to himself". Reviewer from News 18 rated the film 2.5 out of 5 stars and wrote "Jayesbhai Jordaar is not only unsatisfying but also poignant. Despite its rousing moments, the film leaves you feeling unfulfilled". Nandini Ramnath of Scroll.in rated the film 2.5 out of 5 stars and wrote "Everybody would have been better off if Jayeshbhai Jordaar had gotten off its pulpit and smuggled its social messaging through absurdist humour". Anna M. M. Vetticad of Firstpost rated the film 2 out of 5 stars and wrote "Jayeshbhai Jordaar's good intentions are lost to a poor comprehension of gender politics, lack of focus, a saviour complex and above all, ineffective storytelling". Shubhra Gupta of The Indian Express rated the film 1.5 out of 5 stars and wrote "The intentions of this Ranveer Singh-Shalini Pandey film may have been noble, but it comes off as a babble of characters flailing about in a plot which makes you grit your teeth".

Soundtrack 

The film music is composed by Vishal–Shekhar. Written by Kumaar, Jaideep Sahni, Vishal Dadlani and Vayu.

References

External links 
 
 Jayeshbhai Jordaar at Bollywood Hungama

2022 films
2020s Hindi-language films
Indian comedy-drama films
Indian satirical films
2022 comedy-drama films